Julia Isídrez is a Paraguayan ceramist.

Life 
Isídrez was born on February 16, 1967, in Itá in the Central Department, a city that is also nicknamed the Capital of Ceramics.

Isídrez originates from a family of ceramists, and was educated in this profession by her mother Juana Marta Rodas, who had learned it from her mother and grandmother. Ceramic art in Paraguay is principally practiced by women and comes forth from the pre-colonial pottery tradition. During several decades she worked closely with her mother, with whom she exhibited in her own country and abroad. They received many international awards.

Isídrez' work should be classified as modern art, and is characterized by traditional pottery of the countryside with exotic Jesuit and contemporary techniques.

Around 2010, she separated from her mother in a professional sense. In that particular year she held the exposition Paraguay Esquivo in Paris with Ediltrudis Noguera.

Expositions 
The art of Isídrez and Rodas was shown on many expositions in Paraguay and abroad. Here follows a selection:
1976. Gallery van the UNESCO, Paris
1992 and 1993: Gallery Fábrica, Asunción
1994: Salon of the Biennale Martel, Cultural City Center, Asunción
1995: Gallery Lamarca, Asunción
1995: Center of Visual Arts, Museo del Barro, Asunción
1996: Gallery Fábrica, Asunción
1997: Gallery Lamarca, Asunción
1998 and 1999: Center of Visual Arts, Museo del Barro, Asunción
1999: Biennale of the Mercosur, Porto Alegre
2007: 16th international year fair ARte COntemporáneo (ARCO), Madrid
2008: 35th international exhibition of traditional art, Pontifical Catholic University of Chile, Santiago
2009: Museum of Contemporary Crafts Art of Chile, Santiago
Independent and/or with others:
2010: Centro Cultural del Lago, Areguá
2010-2011: Paraguay Esquivo, Maisondes Cultures du Monde à Vitré, Paris, with Ediltrudis Noguera.

Awards 
Isídrez received many awards in the period she worked with her mother:
1994: Grand Prize, Biennale of Martel for Visual Arts, Cultural City Center, Asunción
1998: Prize of the city of Madrid
1999: Prince Claus Award
1999: Award for Best Craft Artist of the UNESCO, the Central Department and the society Hecho à Mano
2001: First Prize in Traditional Art, Cooperativa Universitaria
2008: Lorenzo Berg Salvo Prize, Pontifical Catholic University of Chile, Santiago
2009: Grand Cross of the National Order of Merit, France

References 

1967 births
Living people
People from Itá, Paraguay
Paraguayan ceramists